Georgi Alexandrov Ivanov, nicknamed Gonzo, born 2 July 1976 in Plovdiv), is a former Bulgarian football striker and currently manager. Ivanov is a former Bulgarian international and is perhaps best known for his goal-scoring prowess in The Eternal Derby of Bulgaria, netting 15 goals, having bettered Nasko Sirakov's record in 2008.

Career

Lokomotiv Plovdiv
Georgi Ivanov started his career in his home town Plovdiv playing for local club Lokomotiv Plovdiv. His talent soon became apparent, and he received several call ups for the Bulgarian national football team. For four seasons in Lokomotiv Plovdiv, Georgi earned 60 appearances playing in the Bulgarian top division, scoring 15 goals.

PFC Levski Sofia first period
"Gonzo", as he was known among the fans, signed for Levski Sofia in the summer of 1997. He is believed to have previously been twice on the radar of archrival CSKA Sofia, but then manager Georgi Vasilev deciding on both occasions against securing his services. On 24 October 1997, Gonzo played in his first Eternal Derby and scored the winning goal in the 84th minute after a Vladimir Ivanov assist to help the "bluemen" to a 1:0 victory. In total, Georgi Ivanov has participated in 22 editions of the rivalry, scoring a record-breaking 15 goals (the last time he found the net against the "redmen" was in an A PFG match held in November 2008 that finished 1:1). Levski Sofia have only lost two derby matches against the "reds" with Gonzo on the pitch.

Stade Rennais
Ivanov joined French Ligue 1 side Stade Rennais FC for a club record transfer fee of €4,100,000 in the summer of 2002. After featuring regularly under the management of Philippe Bergeroo, he saw his opportunities reduced following the former's sacking in October 2002 and the appointment of Vahid Halilhodžić. After less than a full year abroad Ivanov rejoined Levski on loan.

PFC Levski Sofia second period
During 2003–04 season, Gonzo played for Levski Sofia again out on loan. He made 21 league appearances and scored nine goals.

Turkish period
Between 2004 and 2006, Georgi Ivanov played in Turkey for Samsunspor and Gaziantepspor.

PFC Levski Sofia third period
Ivanov once again rejoined Levski Sofia on a free transfer from Gaziantepspor in 2006 and won the Bulgarian title for the fourth time in his career.

NK Rijeka
In January 2007, Georgi Ivanov was transferred to Croatian club NK Rijeka. In Croatia, Gonzo was used as a striker and as a defensive midfielder.

PFC Levski Sofia 4th period
On 22 June 2008, he signed a contract with PFC Levski Sofia for the fourth time. Towards the end of the first half of the season he scored 6 goals in 4 matches, including his record 15th against Sofia rivals CSKA. During that season, Gonzo showed once again his strong leadership, playing even with an injury and protectors on his face because of a broken cheek-bone. He became a Champion of Bulgaria in 2009.

Coaching career

Executive Director
Because of injuries, Ivanov did not start the 09/10 season. On 23 July 2009, Ivanov became a manager and head of the sport technical issues in PFC Levski Sofia, but he said that when he is ready he could play again.

Head coach
After the fourth defeat in eight competitions, Levski Sofia have replaced the manager Ratko Dostanic, with the sports manager.

He took over Levski in the 10th round, but collected only 9 points. After the end of the season, Ivanov finished with the team in third place and achieved qualification for the UEFA Europa League.

On 20 May 2010, Ivanov hired Yasen Petrov as Levski's head coach, ending his coaching career.

He also became caretaker manager of Levski following the resignation of Nikolay Kostov on 26 March 2012.

On 10 October 2012, Ivanov was announced as the new manager of Lokomotiv Plovdiv, replacing Emil Velev. However, he left the team after just one day in charge of the training process. Between December 2012 and the summer of 2014, Ivanov served as manager of Cherno More Varna. After that he returned to Levski Sofia, where he alternated between the positions of head coach and director of football (on occasions also holding them at the same time).

On 21 June 2016, Ivanov returned as manager of Cherno More, replacing Nikola Spasov. On 21 September 2017, he resigned following a streak of poor results.

Executive Director
In August 2019, he became the sports director of Lokomotiv Plovdiv.

Bulgaria
On 6 June 2022, Ivanov took over as interim manager of Bulgaria after the resignation of Yasen Petrov.

Managerial statistics

International career
Georgi Ivanov was a part of Bulgaria national football team between 1996 and 2005. He earned his first cap with Bulgaria as a 20-year-old, in a 1–0 victory over Luxembourg on 8 October 1996. For Bulgaria, Gonzo was capped 34 times, scoring 4 goals. He was part of Bulgaria's roster for the 1998 FIFA World Cup in France, but did not make any appearances in the tournament.

International goals
Scores and results list Bulgaria's goal tally first.

Awards
 Topscorer of A PFG – 2001
 Champion of Bulgaria – 2000, 2001, 2002, 2006, 2007, 2009
 Bulgarian Cup – 1998, 2000, 2002, 2007
 Bulgarian Footballer of the Year – 2000, 2001

References

External links 
 Profile at LevskiSofia.info
 

1976 births
Living people
Bulgarian footballers
Stade Rennais F.C. players
PFC Levski Sofia players
PFC Lokomotiv Plovdiv players
HNK Rijeka players
Samsunspor footballers
Gaziantepspor footballers
1998 FIFA World Cup players
Bulgaria international footballers
First Professional Football League (Bulgaria) players
Ligue 1 players
Süper Lig players
Croatian Football League players
Bulgarian expatriate footballers
Expatriate footballers in France
Expatriate footballers in Turkey
Expatriate footballers in Croatia
Bulgarian expatriate sportspeople in Croatia
Bulgarian football managers
PFC Levski Sofia managers
PFC Cherno More Varna managers
PFC Lokomotiv Plovdiv managers
Association football forwards